Pierre Martin can refer to:

 Pierre Martin (cyclist) (born 1938), French cyclist
 Pierre Martin (French Navy officer) (1752–1820)
 Pierre Martin (politician) (born 1943)
 Pierre Martin (engineer) (1932–1986), French spelunker who explored caves in Brazil 
 Pierre-Émile Martin (1824–1915), French industrial engineer
 Buster Martin (Pierre Jean Martin, 1906?–2011), claimed to be the United Kingdom's oldest employee

See also